Antsohihy is a district of Sofia in Madagascar.

Rivers
The Loza River

Communes
The district is further divided into 12 communes:

 Ambimadiro
 Ambodimanary
 Ambodimandresy
 Ampandriakalindy
 Anahidrano
 Andreba
 Anjalazala
 Anjiamangirana I
 Ankerika
 Antsahabe
 Antsohihy
 Maroala

References 

Districts of Sofia Region